The list of ship commissionings in 1862 includes a chronological list of all ships commissioned in 1862.


See also

References

1876
Ship commissionings